Thung Khao Luang is a district (amphoe) of Roi Et province, Thailand.

Geography
The district is in central Roi Et Province. Neighboring districts are (from the south clockwise): At Samat, Thawat Buri, and Selaphum.

The important water resource is the Chi River.

History
The minor district was created on 1 July 1997, when the four tambons Thung Khao Luang, Thoet Thai, Bueng Ngam, and Maba were split off from Thawat Buri district.

The Thai government on 15 May 2007 upgraded all of 81 minor districts to full districts. With publication in the Royal Gazette on 24 August, the upgrade became official.

Administration
The district is divided into five sub-districts (tambons), which are further subdivided into 50 villages (mubans). There are no municipal (thesaban) areas. There are five tambon administrative organization (TAO).

Economy
The largely agricultural local economy is augmented by remittances from local women who married foreigners and live abroad. In Ban Jaan (บ้านจาร) village, a settlement of 540 households, at least 100 households have a Western son-in-law, mostly Swiss, leading the town to be known among Thais as the "Swiss village". Local officials claim the number of resident Swiss is overstated as most live with their wives in Switzerland.

References

External links
amphoe.com

Thung Khao Luang